Clarence Petersen de la Motte (born 1892) was a sailor originally from Bulli, New South Wales. During his early career, he served aboard the New Zealand barque Northern Chief and the steamship Warrimoo.

Douglas Mawson named Cape De la Motte, in George V Land, after him. De la Motte joined the Aurora again in 1916, and served as First Officer during the rescue of the Ross Sea party of the Imperial Trans-Antarctic Expedition, for which he was later awarded the Polar Medal. On 26 February 1921, Clarence married Frances Catherine Laird (late AIF) in Adelaide

References 

1892 births
Australasian Antarctic Expedition
Australian sailors
Recipients of the Polar Medal
Year of death missing